The Italy national shooting team represents Italy in International shooting competitions such as Olympic Games or World shooting Championships.

History
The national Italian shootingteam participated to all the Summer Olympics editions, from London 1908, 22 times on 24.

Medal tables

Olympic Games
The Italian national shooting team (including rifle and pistol events and shotgun) has won 42 medals at the Summer Olympic Games and hits consecutively from Melbourne 1956, that is from 16 editions. The following table highlights the 14 medals in shooting rifle and pistol events (5 gold, 3 silver and 3 bronze). In italics the medals of the women (four medals in total: one gold and three silver).

note: Italic = Women

Multiple medalist

Olympic Games
The list refers to individual and team events and include men and women (in pink color), sorted by number of individual titles.

See also
Italy at the Olympics
Shooting Summer Olympics medal table

References

External links
Italy shooting at Summer Olympics
 Unione Italiana Tiro a Segno

Shooting
Shooting sports in Italy